New Zealand Indoor Bowls (NZIB) is a form of Indoor bowls that is a highly competitive strategic sport. As its only international fixture is a Trans-Tasman event played under Trans-Tasman rules, it is a sport unique to New Zealand.

History

Early development 
NZIB started in Auckland, New Zealand around 1908. Until 1925 however, there was a need for bowls that took a consistent green. The answer came when English bowl manufacturer Taylor Rolph began to produce four inch lignum vitae bowls in sets of 16 that were guaranteed to take a consistent green. These are believed to be the first indoor bowls made specifically for the New Zealand market. 

Another problem faced by the pioneers of the sport was finding a suitable mat. After many others had tried to find a mat suitable for the game, W Miller, manager of the Onehunga woollen mills, was approached to design a special mat that played in a way that satisfied the needs of the game. The size eventually decided on was 22 ft long by 6 ft wide. These measurements are still in use today. 

After these standardisations the game began to spread rapidly. By 1938 there were an estimated 10,000 bowlers in the Auckland area alone. By the mid-1940s NZIB was growing rapidly in most areas. As a result of this growth the New Zealand Indoor Bowling Federation (NZIBF) was formed on 18 September 1948.

Post NZIBF development 
The NZIBF is managed by an executive committee made up of nine members, elected by vote. Canterbury, Hawkes Bay, Horowhenua, Hutt Valley, Palmerston North, Central Taranaki, South Taranaki, Wanganui and Wellington were the first member districts of the Federation. Waikato and Taranaki North joined in 1949 but it wasn't until 1954 that the large Auckland Association affiliated. Their entry brought the total affiliated membership of the time to 21,000. 

Because the game has developed solely  in New Zealand various rules have developed over time that make NZIB unique to New Zealand, Although major rule changes are rare, the NZIBF releases a NZIB law book every 5 years. One notable rule change was the completion of the harmonising of the game by introducing a 2" diameter jack, as up until 1950 an outdoor jack had been used. 

It was around this time that Australian Bowl Manufacturer Hensilite first made its appearance in the NZIB market. Hensilite is now the sole brand of indoor bowl in use in New Zealand. 

A bowl suitable for use in NZIB as defined by the '05 NZIB law book should have these characteristics:

 1. A set of bowls should be in a set of 16, 8 of black and 8 of a contrasting colour
 2. They shall have a draw of not less than 840 millimetres in a run of 5.50 meters on an approved testing table.
 3. Their size and weight should be within the following limits: (i)94.5-100 millimetres (ii) 624-700 grams

Membership
New Zealand Indoor Bowls is made up of 37 centres and 767 clubs covering all of New Zealand. Membership peaked in 1963 with 73,100 affiliated members. Today it has an estimated 30,000 members. Many are attracted to the sport due to the competitiveness and skill it requires.

Stance
Three main stances are used by players of NZIB:
 Kneeling on one knee
 Kneeling on two knees
 Crouching

Scoring system
A game is made up of a series of ends. The winner of the game is the team with the most points when all ends are played or when the time limit is reached. Depending on the rules of play as dictated by the organisers of the competition, if a draw results, either:
 a) A deciding end is played
 b) The scorecard is marked as a drawn game

International competition
International competition only takes place biannually between New Zealand and Australia on a home and away basis. Each country has different rules and conditions, so to even the playing field the match is played on special mats which are longer and thicker than the ones commonly used in New Zealand, but shorter than those used in Australia. The match is also played under a different set of rules due to the variations between the two countries.

Each team comprises the top 7 men and 7 women from each country. They combine to play in men's and  women's singles, men's and  women's pairs, mixed 8 bowl pairs, mixed 6 bowl pairs, men's and women's triples, men's and  women's fours and mixed fours. Games consist of 3 sets of various ends. Each team that wins their set wins the Australasian Medal with the overall scores being combined to decide the winner of the Henselite Trophy.

NZ has won the trophy 14 times to Australia's 4. Australia however are the current holders after defeating NZ 37–29 in Broken Hill, Australia in May 2009. This was Australia's first win since 1991.

Garry Flewitt and Ron Inglis have won the largest amount of Australian medals and share the highest honours. While Flewitt is still a current member of the team Inglis no longer plays for NZ. Dean Gilshnan from Manawatu is fast catching up to the pair. Among the Trans Tasmans' top current players are Simon Thomas, Canterbury, who has won his last 17 games in succession for NZ, and Australia's Monika Korn, who has won 13 successive games.

National competitions

Junior singles
Each year each district selects one under 18 bowler to compete in Wellington for the NZ Junior singles. To qualify for this event, one must be under 18 and be affiliated to a club/centre and to one of the junior singles district competitions. This event also leads into the NZ secondary schools pairs and singles.

Paterson Trophy
The Paterson Trophies were introduced in 1964 as a means of enabling more districts to participate in high level inter-centre competition. The holders of Paterson Trophies at the end of each season compete in a round robin play off for the Welch Trophy. This includes Singles, Pairs and Fours. Currently the Paterson Trophy is held over an area of six zones:
 
 Zone 1. Roskill & Districts, Northland, Auckland, North Harbour, Thames Valley, Counties
 Zone 2. Poverty Bay, Hawkes Bay, Waikato, Tauranga, Bay of Plenty
 Zone 3. Manawatu, King Country, Central King Country, Wanganui, Taranaki, North Taranaki
 Zone 4. Hutt Valley, Wairarapa, Upper Hutt Valley, Horowhenua, Bush Ruahine, North Wellington
 Zone 5. Buller, Marlborough, Canterbury, Ashburton, Nelson, Golden Bay-Motueka
 Zone 6. South Otago, South Canterbury, North Otago, Otago, Central Otago, Southland

For 1989 districts were divided into twelve zones. A round robin competition was staged within each zone. The winner of zones one and two, three and four, etc., played off for a Paterson Trophy. The six Paterson winners then met in the Welch Trophy.

From 1990 to 2004 the Paterson Trophies were run as follows:
Zone 5 & 6 which had four districts meet in a round robin on the fourth weekend in June.
Zone 1, 2, 3, 4, and 7 competed on the third complete weekend in July. The winners of zone 5 & 6 met on the Sunday of that weekend and the winners of each competition won one of the six Paterson Trophies (Zoning from 1991 to 2004 shown below).

 Zone 1 - Northland, Counties, Roskill & Districts, Auckland, North Shore
 Zone 2 - Waikato, Tauranga, King Country, Central King Country, Taranaki, North Taranaki
 Zone 3 - Bay of Plenty, Poverty Bay, Hawkes Bay, Wanganui, Manawatu
 Zone 4 - Upper Hutt Valley, Wairarapa, Bush Ruahine, North Wellington, Hutt Valley, Horowhenua
 Zone 5 - Nelson, Golden Bay-Motueka, Buller, Marlborough
 Zone 6 - Hokitika, Canterbury, Greymouth, Ashburton
 Zone 7 - South Canterbury, North Otago, Otago, Central Otago, South Otago, Southland

Welch Trophy
The Welch Trophy was founded in 1951 and is considered NZIBF's premier inter-centre challenge, the title of which is hotly contested. Although the format has changed over the years, the Welch Trophy is currently played for in a national final between the six Paterson trophy holders for that season.

NZIB Nationals
The Nationals is the premier open tournament of the NZIB season. Almost every affiliated member aspires to winning a Nationals title. Currently they take 8 days of intensive play to complete.

The titles contested for during this time are:
 Singles

 Pairs, won by Blair Spicer and Rob Osborne, Canterbury '09
 Triples (added in 1993), won by Fred Persico, Hayden Warnes and Chris Moffat, Nelson '09
 Fours, won by Joseph Zino, Richard Correy, Denise Clarkson and John Zino, Hutt Valley '09

Special trophies
 Patrons Cup, for the centre with the most game points gathered by its members during the course of play. Won by Canterbury '09.
 Truth Cup, for the woman going the farthest in the national singles. Won by Sue Burnand, Ashburton '09.
 Bob Malcolm Memorial Tray, for the married couple going the farthest in the national pairs. Won by Simon & Julie Thomas, Canterbury '09.
 Cliff Thompson Trophy, for the Junior (under 18 as of 1 March of the year of the championship) who goes the farthest in the Singles. Won by Teri Anderson, North Wellington '09.
 Kath & S.E.N. Smith Trophy, for the farthest senior (over 65 as at 1 June of the year the championships are played). Won by Audrey Martin, Canterbury '09.
 Robertson Trophy, Player of the Tournament. Won by Fred Persico, Nelson '09.

References

External links
 NZ Indoor Bowls Federation website
 Auckland centre website
 Roskill and Districts Centre website
 Otago centre website
 Tauranga centre website
 Horowhenua centre website
 North Wellington centre
 Counties centre website
 North Harbour website
 Northland Centre website
 Canterbury Centre website

Bowls in New Zealand